The 2020–21 Supercopa de España Femenina was the second edition of the current Supercopa de España Femenina, an annual women's football competition for clubs in the Spanish football league system that were successful in its major competitions in the preceding season.

The competition was held in Almería. Atlético Madrid won their first title after defeating Levante 3–0 in the final.

Draw 
The draw for the competition was held on 17 December 2020.

Qualification 
The competition featured both finalists of the 2019–20 Copa de la Reina, as well as the highest-ranked clubs at the 2019–20 Primera División that had not already qualified through the cup final.

Qualified teams 
The following four teams qualified for the tournament.

Matches 
All matches were played at the Estadio de los Juegos Mediterráneos in Almería.

Bracket

Semi-finals

Final

Notes

See also 
 2020–21 Primera División
 2020–21 Copa de la Reina

References 

2020–21 in Spanish football cups
2020